The Johannisberg (formerly also called Keeserkopf and Herzoghut) is a  high mountain in the Glockner Group of the High Tauern, a mountain range of the Central Eastern Alps in Austria. 

The peak is located in the central section of the main Tauern crest, right on the border between the Austrian states of Salzburg and Carinthia, near the tripoint with East Tyrol. It was given its present name in honour of Archduke John of Austria by the Regensburg botanist David Heinrich Hoppe in 1832, on the occasion of a failed attempt to advance into the area beyond the Riffltor (3,094 m). The Johannisberg has, seen from the east, a firn-capped dome shape, its western side consists of a mighty, 450 metre high and 50° inclined West Face. Long, prominent, knife-edge ridges radiate away from it to the northwest and southwest. The mountain is a popular destination for walkers and climbers due to its easy accessibility.

References

Sources and maps 
Willi End: Glocknergruppe Alpine Club Guide, Bergverlag Rother, Munich, 2003, 
Eduard Richter: Die Erschließung der Ostalpen, III. Band, Verlag des Deutschen und Oesterreichischen Alpenvereins, Berlin 1894
Alpine Club map 1:25.000, Sheet 40, Glocknergruppe

External links 

Mountains of the Alps
Glockner Group
Mountains of Carinthia (state)
Mountains of Salzburg (state)
Alpine three-thousanders